André Bolduc (born March 25, 1971 in Alma, Quebec) is a former Canadian football slotback and is the run game coordinator and running backs coach with the Saskatchewan Roughriders of the Canadian Football League (CFL).

University career
Bolduc played CIAU football as a wide receiver for the Concordia Stingers from 1992 to 1995. He was a member of the 1993 Dunsmore Cup championship team and was an All-Star in 1994 and 1995.

Professional career
As a professional player, Bolduc played for six seasons for the Ottawa Rough Riders, Edmonton Eskimos, and Montreal Alouettes of the CFL.

Coaching career

RSEQ
Bolduc began his coaching career with the Montreal Carabins in 2002 as the team's offensive coordinator before joining Collège Montmorency to coach the Nomades. Bolduc then became the head coach of the Sherbrooke Vert et Or in 2007 and led the team to its first playoff win in 2010. He resigned as head coach following the 2011 season, citing the need to spend more time with his family.

Montreal Alouettes
In 2014, Bolduc joined the Montreal Alouettes as an offensive assistant coach. He became the receivers coach in 2015 and was the special teams assistant coach in 2016. He moved to running backs coach in 2017 and added the title of assistant head coach in 2020 with Khari Jones as the team's head coach. In early December 2022, it was reported that Bolduc was one of five finalists for the vacant Alouettes head coaching job.

Saskatchewan Roughriders
On February 7, 2023, it was announced that Bolduc had joined the Saskatchewan Roughriders as the team's run game coordinator and running backs coach.

Personal life
Bolduc has four children, Thomas, Raphaël, Justine, and Elizabeth.

References

External links
Saskatchewan Roughriders profile

1971 births
Canadian football slotbacks
Edmonton Elks players
French Quebecers
Montreal Alouettes players
Ottawa Rough Riders players
Living people
People from Alma, Quebec
Players of Canadian football from Quebec
Sherbrooke Vert et Or football players
Montreal Carabins football coaches
Sherbrooke Vert et Or football coaches
Montreal Alouettes coaches
Saskatchewan Roughriders coaches